Yankalilla, also spelt Yarnkalyilla,  may refer to:
 
Yankalilla, South Australia, a locality
Yankalilla Bay, a bay in South Australia
Yankalilla Football Club, an Australian rules football club in South Australia 
Yankalilla River, a river whose mouth is at Lady Bay, South Australia
District Council of Yankalilla, a local government area in South Australia
Hundred of Yankalilla, a cadastral unit in South Australia

See also
Shrine of Our Lady of Yankalilla